The VALOR number is a code which uniquely identifies listed securities and financial instruments in Switzerland, and serves a similar purpose to CUSIP or WKN in the North American or German markets respectively.  The VALOR number is incorporated in the Swiss ISIN number.

Allocation Methodology
The VALOR number is a numeric code that intrinsically has no meaning. When a new VALOR is needed, the next one from the list is simply allocated. An instrument's number indicates nothing about the instrument itself.

Uses
The VALOR number can be used for a number of purposes in identifying a financial instrument:
 Globally a VALOR number is allocated for any type of financial instrument which meets the allocation rules. It can be used in conjunction with the Market Identifier Code (MIC) and the currency code to uniquely identify a traded instrument. It can be used in transaction reporting and for position keeping.
In Switzerland and Liechtenstein the VALOR number is the main identifier in the Swiss Value Chain  and is used as the main identifier by financial institutions throughout the region and beyond.
 Valorens for derivatives may be reused after the derivative expires

Etymology
The word Valor is a Swiss German banking term for a "security", including coins and paper money. In Switzerland, when referring to the code, it is always referred to as the "VALOR Nummer" i.e. security number. The plural of VALOR in Swiss German is Valoren.

In the English speaking world, the words "VALOR" and "VALOREN" are sometimes used interchangeably.

Issuing Authority
The VALOR number is issued by SIX Financial Information

See also
 International Securities Identification Number (ISIN)
 ISO 10383
 ISO 10962
 ISO 6166
 NSIN
 Ticker symbol
 Option symbol
 SEDOL

References

Financial metadata
Financial services in Switzerland
Security identifier types